The UK Youth Parliament (UKYP) is a youth organisation in the United Kingdom, consisting of democratically elected members aged between 11 and 18.

Formed in 2000, the parliament has 369 members, who are elected to represent the views of young people in their area to government and service providers. Over 500,000 young people vote in the elections each year, which are held in over 90 percent of constituencies. It is managed by the British Youth Council.

Members meet regularly to hold debates and plan campaigns at least three times a year locally, and twice on a national level, which includes the annual debate within the Chamber of the House of Commons every November. Young people hold positions throughout the organisation's management, and it has been endorsed by the majority of the UK's political parties.

Those elected for UKYP hold the suffix of MYP (Member of the UK Youth Parliament).

During House of Commons sitting, UK Youth Parliament will be co-chaired by Speaker Lindsay Hoyle and Deputy Speaker Eleanor Laing.

Formation 
The concept of a United Kingdom Youth Parliament first arose at an event in Coventry entitled "Heirs To The Millennium". After the event, the MP Andrew Rowe and the National Society for the Prevention of Cruelty to Children and youth worker Kate Parish began to develop a proposal for the youth advocacy group. In 1998, a steering committee was formed, led by Andrew Rowe and chaired by a young person named Jannik Ecke.

In 2000, Malcolm Wicks, Department for Education and Employment, agreed to employ a member of staff who would work full-time on developing the UK Youth Parliament alongside Kate Parish. Soon after, the first elections for the UK Youth Parliament were held, with the first Annual Sitting being held in 2001.

There is wide debate over who was key to the formation of the UK Youth Parliament with several people trying to claim that they were key to its formation.

Composition

Membership 

A Member of Youth Parliament (MYP) works with MPs, service providers, and decision makers in order to present the views of their constituents to them. Deputy or Support Members of Youth Parliament (DMYP/SMYP) are also elected, although not every MYP has a deputy. Deputies work with and support their Member of Youth Parliament locally and regionally, but are not entitled to attend the Annual Sitting or other national events – unless their MYP is unable to.

There are 369 constituencies that MYPs can sit in.

Elections 
The UK Youth Parliament elections are held every one or two years (depending on the local authority), with all young people between the ages of 11 and 18 being entitled to vote or stand. In England, over 90 percent of the local education authorities hold UKYP elections.

Young people elect their local area's MYPs, who provide a voice for the young people in their area. The number of MYP positions is proportionate to the population of young people in the authority.

Over one million votes were cast in the elections between 2006 and 2009. In 2008, 565,802 young people voted, with 1,625 standing as candidates from across England, Wales, and Northern Ireland.

Outside of England, partner organisations undertake the elections; in Scotland, elections are held every two years for young people to elect their local Member of the Scottish Youth Parliament (MSYP). The Scottish Youth Parliament then internally appoints sixteen of their members to represent the nation as their Members of the UK Youth Parliament which means that Scottish MYPs hold a dual mandate as both a MYP and a MSYP. In Northern Ireland a similar system is used by the Northern Ireland Youth Forum and was used in Wales until 2014 by the Children and Young People's Assembly for Wales. In 2018 the first online elections were held in Wales which returned 60 members for the Welsh Youth Parliament.

Meetings

Annual Sitting 

The Annual Sitting is the parliament's main yearly meeting, which all MYPs attend. It takes place on a university campus over three days. Proceedings include keynote speeches from political figures, followed by question and answer sessions. Past speakers include Hazel Blears, Ben Bradshaw, and Des Browne. MYPs also hold debates on topical issues, undertake training in campaigning, democracy and leadership, and consult with outside organisations such as the Ministry of Justice, BBC Trust and Department for Transport.

At each Annual Sitting, a manifesto is created, in which MYPs aim to fully represent the issues that affect their constituents in a single document. Policies are developed based on seven key areas: Culture, Media & Sport, Education & Employment, Empowering Young People, Health, International Matters, Law & Society, and Transport, Environment and Rural Affairs. This manifesto is then presented to government as a current overview of young peoples’ views.

The 9th Annual Sitting was held at the University of Kent from 24 July to 27 July 2009. The keynote speakers were:
 John Bercow, Speaker of the House of Commons
 Wes Streeting, President of the National Union of Students
 Jonathan Shaw, Minister for the South East
 Rowan Williams, the Archbishop of Canterbury

UKYP's 10th Annual Sitting for 2010 was held at Ulster University between Friday 23 July and Monday 26 July.

UKYP held its 11th Annual Sitting in 2011 at the University of Leeds from Friday 22 July to Sunday 24 July. UKYP were joined by the following speakers:
 John Bercow
 Iby Knell, a Holocaust survivor
 Natascha Engel, Chair of the Backbench Business Committee
 Tim Loughton, Parliamentary Under Secretary for Children & Families
 Maggie Atkinson, Children's Commissioner
 Chris Williamson, Labour politician
 Liam Burns, NUS President
 Susan Nash, Chair of Young Labour
 Ben Howlett, Chairman of Conservative Future

The 12th UKYP Annual Sitting for 2012 took place at the University of Nottingham over the weekend of 27–29 July.

The 13th UKYP Annual Sitting for 2013 again took place at the University of Leeds. Speakers included Vince Cable; John Bercow; and Pamela Warhurst of Incredible Edible.

The 14th UKYP Annual Sitting for 2014 took place at the University of Lancaster over the weekend of 25–27 July. Keynote Speakers included John Bercow; Maggie Atkinson; and Kamal Hyman, a previous Member of Youth Parliament for Peterborough.

The 15th UKYP Annual Sitting for 2015 took place at the University of Exeter over the weekend of 31 July – 2 August. Keynote Speakers included John Bercow; Jonny Chatteron, founder of the campaign group Campaign BootCamp; and Siân James former Labour Party Member of Parliament for Swansea East.

UKYP'S 16th Annual Sitting for 2016 took place at the University of York, between 22 and 24 July. Keynote speakers included John Bercow and Gulwali Passarlay.

In 2017, UKYP's 17th Annual Sitting took place at Liverpool Hope University between 28 and 30 July 2017, with keynote speakers John Bercow and Hillsborough campaigner Margaret Aspinall, as well as various MPs and campaigners involved in a panel debate.

The 18th UKYP Annual Conference - name changed after a vote was held and majority returned in favour of change – took place at the University of Nottingham from 27–29 July 2018. The keynote speakers included John Bercow, Joy Warmington of brap and Alison Kriel of Amaya Trust.

The 19th UKYP Annual Conference took place at the University of Leeds from 2–4 August 2019, where the keynote speakers included John Bercow.

The 20th and 21st UKYP Annual conferences took place online due to COVID 19.

The 22nd UKYP Annual conference took place at the University of Hull from 22-24 July 2022 and included keynote speakers such as Bank of England.

Circles of Influence 
The annual Circles of Influence aimed to focus on key youth issues, by engaging government departments, public organisations and young people in an exciting debate format. It involved around 200 MYPs holding discussions seated in a circular shape.

The event was first held in 2006, and took place at the British Museum. It has focused on topics including talent, leadership, and intergenerational relations. Prominent attendees included Tessa Jowell, Lord Taylor and Harriet Harman.

House of Lords debates 
In May 2008, the UKYP was granted permission to hold a debate between over 300 MYPs in the House of Lords, making it one of only two organisations to ever use the venue for non-Parliamentary proceedings, the other being the English Speaking Union for their International Mace Final on 12 May 2007. The event was chaired by the Lord Speaker Baroness Hayman and was broadcast on BBC Parliament.

The debates held were:
 Recycling and the environment
 National transport concession for young people
 Abolish university tuition fees
 Fair representation of young people in the media
 Lowering the voting age to 16
 Whether the amount of betting shops should be restricted.  
 Single age of adulthood

House of Commons debates

2007–09 
Prime Minister Gordon Brown suggested that members of the UK Youth Parliament could have annual access to the House of Commons chamber in 2007, but this did not come about until March 2009, when a motion was passed to allow the UK Youth Parliament to use the House of Commons for that year's annual meeting. However, a Conservative Member of Parliament objected, which forced a vote to be taken on the issue, also employing a procedure called "I spy strangers" (historically used to expel disruptive spectators, but now mostly to disrupt the House's business) to take business in the House beyond 7:00pm and stifle any possible debate on the issue. On 12 March, a second debate was held in the House of Commons with a vote set to be taken four days later.

On 16 March 2009, 189 Members of Parliament voted to allow the UK Youth Parliament to debate in the House of Commons, with 16 votes of opposition by Conservative backbenchers. It was the first time in history that the House of Commons chamber was used by a group other than MPs.

An online vote was held from July to determine the debate topics, which were:
 Abolish university tuition fees
 Youth crime and how to tackle it
 Free transport for over 60s, but not for young people
 Capitalism, the economy and job opportunities for young people
 Lowering the voting age to 16

The debates took place in the House of Commons chamber on Friday 30 October 2009, from 11 am to 3:30 pm. The session was recorded in Hansard, and the morning debates were broadcast on BBC Parliament the same day. The final two debates were televised later in the week.

The debates were chaired by John Bercow, Speaker of the House of Commons, who closed the event with a dramatic speech to MYPs in which he described the British National Party as "a poison which we could well do without". The Speaker is usually expected to remain impartial, so as not to compromise his authority, but in this case was able to express personal opinion because the ornamental mace that indicates Parliament is sitting was not in place.

2010 
In 2010 a debate was held to disuses the possibility of the youth parliament returning for a second sitting.  This resulted in the decision to allow their return not only for that year, but every year for the remainder of the sitting of the current parliament.

UKYP's 2010 Debate took place on 29 October, again chaired by John Bercow, Speaker of the House of Commons with the topics chosen for debate being selected from an Online Ballot. It was broadcast live on Parliament's Website & BBC Parliament.

As reported on the UK Youth Parliament's official website, the results of the five issues that were debated are listed as follows:
Should sex and relationships education be compulsory from primary school onwards? FOR-211 and AGAINST-104 
Should university tuition fees rise? FOR-57 and AGAINST-267
Should the school leaving age be raised to 18 immediately in order to lower youth unemployment? FOR-56 and AGAINST-271 
Should we withdraw all British troops from Afghanistan by 2012? FOR-137 and AGAINST-179 
Should reduced transport fares for young people be protected from spending cuts? FOR-239 and AGAINST-80

Therefore, "Should reduced transport fares for young people be protected from spending cuts?" became UKYP's National Campaign for 2011.

2011 
In 2011, the Members of Youth Parliament again debated in the House of Commons on 4 November. This time five topics were chosen by over 65,000 young people. The event was chaired by John Bercow, Speaker of the House of Commons, after his persistence in supporting the youth parliament. The sitting was broadcast on BBC Parliament but this time live from 11:00 am – 4:00 pm.

Following the debates, the motion entitled 'Make public transport cheaper, better and accessible for all' was chosen as UKYP's National Campaign for 2012.

2012 
In 2012 and for the fourth time, Members of UKYP gathered in the House of Commons on 23 November, with the topics again being chosen through the Make Your Ballot. There was a large increase in turnout. From 65,000 in 2011, over 253,000 took part to choose the five topics that were debated. Again it was chaired by John Bercow, Speaker of the House of Commons, and was broadcast live via Parliament's Website & BBC Parliament from 11:00-16:00. ‘A Curriculum To Prepare Us For Life’ received 154 votes from the 295 cast and therefore became UKYP's 2013 National Campaign.

2013 
In 2013, Members of UKYP came together for the fifth year in a row to debate on the green benches on 15 November, the top five issues chosen through the Make Your Mark Ballot. A record 478,386 young people took part, an increase of over 225,000 from 2012. In a difference to choosing campaigns, Members of UKYP chose two campaigns for 2014; one UK-wide issue and one devolved issue (England only). It was chaired like the other debates by John Bercow, Speaker of the House of Commons, and broadcast live on Parliament's Website & BBC Parliament from 11:00–16:00.

Following the debates in which Nick Hurd MP, then Minister for Civil Society stated that "Old shouldn't dominate politics", "Votes For 16 and 17 Year Olds In All Public Elections" was prioritised as the UK Priority Campaign for 2014, whilst ‘A Curriculum To Prepare Us For Life’ was voted as the priority campaign for England.

2014 
The 2014 UKYP sitting in the House of Commons took place on 14 November with the biggest media attention in the sitting's six-year history. Once more chaired by John Bercow, Speaker of the House of Commons, the topics were chosen through 876,488 ballots, around 14.8% of the UK's 11–18-year-old population. The proceedings were broadcast on Parliament's website as tradition but were only shown through the BBC via their Democracy Live Site; the reason for this was due to the Scottish National Party's Annual Autumn Conference commencing that day. However, it was broadcast between 20:20 and 00:00 on BBC Parliament that day to give chance for viewers to watch if they could not watch online. Also, for the first time the event was covered by Sky News on the world's biggest video sharing site, YouTube through their Stand Up Be Counted campaign, which was launched in the summer of 2014.

Before the debates on campaigns occurred, MYPs held a special commemoration marking the 100th anniversary of the start of World War I. Thirteen MYPs were selected by a video application process to speak from the Dispatch Boxes on how the war affected either their families or region followed by one minute of silence. This was agreed on at UKYP's Annual Sitting in Lancaster that summer.

Once the debates and speeches from Leader of the House of Commons, William Hague, Natascha Engel MP and Tessa Munt MP had taken place, the following information shows the results of the two votes; one for the UK-wide 2015 issue and like 2013's debate, one devolved issue for England:

UK-wide issue: 
Everyone should be paid at least the Living Wage: 156 
Votes for 16- and 17-year-olds in all public elections: 117

England-wide issue:
Mental health services should be improved with our help: 176
Better work experience and careers advice: 78
Bring back exam resits in English and Maths: 32

Therefore, 'Everyone should be paid at least the Living Wage' was chosen as UKYP's UK Campaign for 2015 whiles 'Mental Health services should be improved by our help' became UKYP's 2015 Campaign for England.

2015 

The 2015 sitting took place on 13 November, following the counting of 969,992 Make Your Mark Ballots that were cast through the ballot.

After the debates occurred, a special 30-minute debate entitled "My Magna Carta" was held, 800 years after the historic document was first signed.

The information below states the results of the ballots, to choose what of the debated topics would become the two priority campaigns for 2016:

UK Wide:

•	Working together to combat racism and religious discrimination: 155

•	Everyone should be paid at least the Living Wage: 117

Tackling Racism and Religious Discrimination, therefore, became the UK Wide campaign for 2016, and became the inquiry subject for the year's Youth Select Committee.

Devolved:

•	Mental health services should be improved with our help: 176

•	A curriculum to prepare us for life: 110

•	Make public transport cheaper, better and accessible for all: 33

The existing Mental Health campaign was therefore re-selected as the devolved campaign for 2016.

2019 Sitting - amongst the General Election campaign 

Despite the calling of the 2019 United Kingdom general election, the sitting still went ahead and took place on 8 November 2019. The debates were chaired for the first time by both the new Speaker Sir Lindsay Hoyle and fellow speakership candidate and current 1st Deputy Speaker Dame Eleanor Laing.

As has been for each sitting, the Make Your Mark ballot determined the topics and overall saw just over 840,000 young people take part across the United Kingdom in 2019, with the motion on Protecting the Environment becoming the parliament's UK wise campaign for 2020 and Ending Knife Crime being chosen by MYP's as the devolved campaign topic.

The full results were as follows:

UK Wide Campaign Topic

Protecting the Climate - 179

Tackling Hate Crime - 68

Devolved Campaign Topic

Mental Health - 69

Curriculum to Prepare us for Life - 86

Put an End to Knife Crime - 87

For the first time, the UK wide campaign topic will be launched as a Parliamentary E-Petition of which will be debated in the Commons chamber, if 100,000 members of the public sign it. The petition will be launched in early 2020.

Due to dissolution of Parliament and it having taken place on 6 November 2019 (being prior to 8 November's proceedings), full broadcasting of the debates along with the publication of media reports, under election regulations were not published until 16 December 2019 – the week following the election. Full proceedings were made available on Parliament's YouTube channel that morning.

2020 and 2021

As a result of the COVID-19 pandemic, the 2020 sitting planned for November 6 or 13th (the planned date was never formally confirmed), was postponed to an unknown date in 2021 and the Make Your Mark Ballot was, for the first time in its history, exclusively  held online via the website of UK Parliament Week - which either was commenced or concluded by UKYP's set of debates.

Paul Boskett Memorial Trophy 

In 2014 the introduction of the Paul Boskett Debate Lead Trophy was introduced. Every region elects someone to represent them and speak at the Dispatch Box and the strongest speaker is now awarded; the name comes from the late Paul Boskett MBE, who died in 2014 aged 59; he worked and was a lead figure within the British Youth Council. Paul is cited as a major inspiration for many young people and seen as a key champion of youth voice. The first Debate Lead Champion was Ife Grillo who sat as a Vice Chair to the British Youth Council between 2015-2017 and at the time of the Commons debate on 14 November 2014, represented the London Borough of Hackney.

Regional 
Members of Youth Parliament in England are split into nine geographical regions, which meet and work together regularly: London, East Midlands, West Midlands, South West, South East, North West, North East, Yorkshire and the Humber, East of England.

Regional meetings known as conventions take place three times a year (June, October and December) and last around a day. Members share news, issues and resources, in addition to taking part in training to help them in their role, relevant Government Consultations and within the October Convention, Elections occur to decide regional representatives to be a Debate Lead for UKYP's House of Commons Debate and the UKYP Steering Group for the following year (1 February to 31 January).

Campaigns 
The UK Youth Parliament launched the "Make Your Mark" ballot in 2011. The purpose of the ballot to get young people from across the UK to determine which five topics the UK Youth Parliament would debate within the House of Commons. Over 65,000 young people completed the ballot after several months of campaigning.

The first five issues debated in the House of Commons chamber through 'Make Your Mark' were:
 "Make public transport cheaper, better and accessible for all"
 "No to tuition fees, yes to graduate tax"
 "Zero tolerance towards bullying in schools"
 "End child poverty"
 "A Greener future for Britain"

On 4 November 2011, Members of Youth Parliament came from across the UK to debate and vote at House of Commons the most important issue to campaign on in 2012. The winning campaign topic was "Make public transport cheaper, better and accessible for all".

2012's sitting chose ‘A Curriculum To Prepare Us For Life’ as the 2013 National Campaign. Over 253,000 young people took part.

In 2013, "Votes For 16 and 17 Year Old's In All Public Elections" was prioritised as the UK Priority Campaign for 2014, whilst "A Curriculum To Prepare Us For Life" was voted as the priority campaign for England. A new record of 478,386 young people cast a vote.

In 2014  876,488 young people helped to choose the House of Commons topics; over 14.8% of the UK's 11–18 year old population. 'Everyone should be paid at least the Living Wage' was chosen as UKYP's UK Campaign for 2015 with a National Campaign Day occurring on 24 January 2015. Also 'Mental Health services should be improved by our help' became UKYP's 2015 Campaign for England.

2015 recorded 969,992 votes and saw that year's Commons Debate select Mental Health chosen as the England Campaign issue and Tackling Racism & Discrimination as the UK priority topic to campaign on.

2016 saw another increase in MYM's total, with 978,216 having their say and as a result of that year's debates on the famous Green Benches, saw Votes at 16 be selected as the England campaign issue and a Curriculum for Life for the 2nd time be the national priority campaign topic.

In 2017, the Make Your Mark for the first time in the ballot's history fell, to 954,766 – of which however was widely still seen as an impressive total considering the scale of Youth Provision cuts since 2010. Both issues chosen in 2016, of a Curriculum for Life and Votes at 16 were once again selected by MYP's to be the priority campaign topics, however with them being switched in relation to the campaign area, meaning Votes at 16 took national precedent and a Curriculum for Life reverted to England only focus.

2018's Ballot has written history and seen a initial total of 1,022,286 votes be declared, marking the first time Make Your Mark has exceeded 7 figures; with an increased and revised 2nd total to be announced on 24 October 2018, along with the Commons Debate topics for the year's proceedings to be held on 9 November 2018.

Organisation

Governance

Steering Group 
Decisions regarding the development and progression of the organisation is undertaken by the Steering Group, made up of one MYP elected from each region and nation (known as "SGs"), for a 12-month term from 1 February to 31 January the following year. Their main focus is "key decisions relating to the membership and the programme of work, within the given strategic boundaries".

They meet a minimum of four times a year to represent their regions nationally, coordinate campaign efforts and organise events such as the Annual Conference. Reports are taken back to MYPs at their regional conventions & other meetings.

The name of the group was changed from Procedures Group to Steering Group in November 2019 in order to reflect the groups varied responsibilities better.

The Current Steering Group Members are as follows:

East Midlands – Callum  Parr

East of England – Elicia D'Ambrosio

London – Taif Rahman

North East – Robbie Scott 

North West – Andrew Speight

Northern Ireland – TBC 

Scotland –  Emma Prach

South East –  Gareth Boyes

South West -  Jamie Burrell 

West Midlands – Dylan Pascall 

Yorkshire and Humber – Safaa Shreef

Management and support 

The British Youth Council manages the UK Youth Parliament. The British Youth Council won a bid in 2011, granted by the Department for Education to lead a national Youth Voice Service. Youth Voice will support young people in influencing local and national Government decision making in England, and provide continued support for the UK Youth Parliament.

The corporate and administrative governance is overseen by the Board of Trustees of the British Youth Council.

Reception

Praise 
The organisation has been endorsed by former Prime Ministers Gordon Brown and David Cameron. It has also been endorsed by former Liberal Democrat Party Leader and former Deputy Prime Minister Nick Clegg. In 2009, Brown described the UK Youth Parliament as "a symbol of the politics we should all strive for - politics that bring people together to work for what is best for us all."

In 2006, the organisation's Head of Programmes Kate Parish was given a National Council for Voluntary Youth Services Award, for her "commendable dedication to the development of UK Youth Parliament".

In 2008, the UK Youth Parliament was given the Positive Images award by the Children & Young People Now magazine for exposing young people’s experiences of the current levels of sex and relationships education in a high-profile publicity campaign. In 2009, the organisation also received a Brook special achievement award for this campaign.

Criticism 
A study by the University of Colorado found that youth participation organisations in the UK, including the UK Youth Parliament, needed to "tackle the unintentional practice of tokenism". The paper concludes that "failing to act upon [young people's] opinions or take them very seriously" once they are identified is often a cause of frustration amongst participants.

See also 

Scottish Youth Parliament
Welsh Youth Parliament
Youth politics
Youth organisations in the United Kingdom
Youth unemployment in the United Kingdom

References

External links 
Official website

Youth model government
Youth-led organizations
Political organisations based in the United Kingdom
Youth empowerment organizations
1999 establishments in the United Kingdom
Charities based in London
Organisations based in the London Borough of Hackney
Youth organisations based in England